Yapacaní Airport  is an airport serving the town of Yapacaní in the Santa Cruz Department of Bolivia.

See also

Transport in Bolivia
List of airports in Bolivia

References

External links 
OurAirports - Yapacaní
FallingRain - Yapacaní Airport

Airports in Santa Cruz Department (Bolivia)